The Seulles is a river in Normandy, France. Its tributaries include the Mue.

References

Rivers of Calvados (department)
Rivers of Normandy
Rivers of France
0Seulles
Normandy region articles needing translation from French Wikipedia